Fortress is the second studio album by Canadian band Protest the Hero which was released on January 29, 2008 on Vagrant Records in the US and Underground Operations in Canada.

Overview 
Fortress was recorded at Silo Studios in Hamilton, Ontario during the summer of 2007. The album contains 10 tracks broken into three movements, separated by piano interludes, and is approximately 41 minutes in length. The band has stated that the sound is similar to Kezia but with a "less poppy and more technical metal" influence. Fortress does not revolve around a single concept, unlike their previous album. Instead, it is more akin to "goddess worship in the tradition of Robert Graves," according to their bassist and lyricist Arif Mirabdolbaghi:

"It has to do with goddess worship, and how there has been this degendering of the Lord and Savior, and the suppressed feminine. A lot of it is based in Genghis Khan and old Irish Mythology, about the rise and fall of the Goddess of the forest. [The theme] can be more appreciated by more people. If I had to reduce it to its simplest form, the concept is about the re-emerging of goddess worship and the erosion of faith in scientific process." 

Also, states lead singer Rody Walker:

"This album is nothing to be intellectualized. All talk of wonder, pathos and optimism aside. I feel it’s a very natural progression for us. A natural progression into further obscurity. I am of the belief a lot of the people who work for us were hoping for a stab at a more commercially viable album, however we wrote what we wanted without linear boundaries and created something less commercial than ever. Some fans of the band will hate it. And some people who hate the band will love it. All others can rot."

Singles 
In January, a music video was shot for the song "Bloodmeat",  which is available on the MuchMusic website. As of December 11, "Bloodmeat" is available for download on the Canadian iTunes Music Store. Additionally, the band released the song "Sequoia Throne" on their MySpace page audio player, but was later replaced with "Bloodmeat".

A music video for the song "Sequoia Throne" was filmed and released in April, and was also made available on the MuchMusic website. Another video, this one for "Palms Read", began filming in September under director Sean Michael Turrell, and was released in late October.

Critical reception 

Fortress debuted at #95 on the US Billboard Top 200 chart with first week sales of 7,600 copies, also managing #10 spot on the Billboard Top Independent Album chart. In Canada, the album achieved #1 status the first week of its release. Mike Portnoy named this album one of his favourite albums of 2008 on his official web page.

Fortress, like its predecessor Kezia, achieved universal acclaim with high regards from many major publications, receiving a comprehensive score of 86 on Metacritic making it the 12th best reviewed album on the site for 2008. Tyler Patrick Munro of SputnikMusic states: "The album improves on everything established on Kezia (right down to the much more natural sounding piano codas), and it does so without the sometimes blatant repetition of its predecessor." He cites the track "Bone Marrow," stating: "While 'Bone Marrow' places more emphasis on the underpinning synths of the first two tracks, its heavy orchestration still takes a backseat to its varying structure, which fluidly transits from hyper-melodic up-tempo to ball-crushing gutturals and chugged syncopation, all of which are made twice as effective by the interwoven bass slapping," and compares the style of the opener "Bloodmeat" to the dissonance of  The Dillinger Escape Plan and Converge. John A. Hanson, also reviewing for Sputnikmusic, writes: "[W]ith Fortress, Protest the Hero have almost shed all of their past imperfections and crafted something really special," going on to praise frontman Rody Walker for his vocal range and improvement since Kezia. Katherine Fulton of Allmusic praised the band for their originality and boldness, writing: "More risks are taken, from the nearly hidden horns on 'The Dissentience' to the shimmering piano solo at the beginning of 'Sequoia Throne' and the playful interlude that bridges 'Palms Read' and 'Limb from Limb,'" though she ultimately criticized the album's "frantic" pace.

Track listing
Fortress is broken up into three sections, all of which are titled, except the second section though it is often referred to as the album title. An intro track before "Bloodmeat" can be found by rewinding from the CD from the beginning. This pre-gap is not detected by iTunes.

Personnel 
Rody Walker - vocals
Luke Hoskin - guitar, piano, backing vocals
Tim Millar - guitar, piano
Arif Mirabdolbaghi - bass, backing vocals
Moe Carlson - drums

Additional personnel
Vadim Pruzhanov - keyboards on the track "Limb From Limb".
Dan Fila - Additional percussion
Julius "Juice" Butty - Producer
Mark Spicoluk - Executive producer
Nick Blagona - Engineer
Sons of Nero - artwork

Charts

References

External links
 

2008 albums
Protest the Hero albums
Underground Operations albums
Albums recorded at Metalworks Studios
Albums with cover art by Sons of Nero